The Mellor Orion (previously known as the Bluebird Orion) is a minibus body manufactured on Fiat Ducato chassis since 2011, introduced by Bluebird Vehicles and subsequently built by Mellor Coachcraft since 2014. Several variants are produced, including the long-wheelbase Orion Plus and the fully electric Orion E. In 2021, Mellor launched an updated version known as the Orion Evolution.

An eight-seater private hire taxi variant, known as the Mellor Pico, was launched in 2019 on short-wheelbase Fiat Ducato chassis.

Operators

Orion 
The Mellor Orion has proven popular with local councils in providing accessible transport, home-to-school transport and demand responsive or low-demand rural services. One of the largest customers for the Orion has been Dorset County Council, who took delivery of 39 Orions between 2016 and 2018 in a major renewal of their minibus fleet. Other large customers for the Orion include Nottinghamshire County Council, who have taken delivery of eleven examples; Durham County Council, who operate seven Orions; and Edinburgh City Council, who ordered twelve vehicles in 2019.

The Orion has also been offered to foreign markets. In early 2014, a Bluebird Orion Plus was exported to Australia and tested by several operators after being route tested by Australasian Bus & Coach magazine.

Orion E 
The first production Orion E entered service in 2019 with the National Galleries of Scotland on a shuttle service between its three sites. Seven Orion Es were delivered to First West Yorkshire in Leeds in 2021 for the new Flexibus East Leeds demand responsive transport service. Cheshire West and Chester Council took delivery of an Orion E in 2022 to join their existing fleet of diesel Orions, marking the council's first investment in electric buses. Other customers include Nottingham City Council, who are evaluating a single Orion E alongside other electric vehicles as part of their Project EVE.

Pico 
The Mellor Pico was launched at the Busworld exposition in Brussels in October 2019. Aimed at the taxi and demand responsive market, the Pico is built on the shortest wheelbase Fiat Ducato chassis and contains up to eight passenger seats, competing with contemporary taxis such as the LEVC TX.

References 

Fiat vehicles
Mellor Coachcraft
Minibuses